Miguel Angel Hurtado Suarez (born July 4, 1985, in Santa Cruz, Bolivia) is a Bolivian footballer who plays as a defender.

In his career, he has played for four clubs in the Liga de Fútbol Profesional Boliviano. Clubs he played for include La Paz, Nacional Potosí, Real Potosí and his current club Blooming.

International career
Miguel Angel Hurtado has also played for the Bolivia national football team making 3 appearances for them including two friendlies and one appearance in the 2015 Copa America.

Club career statistics

Achievements
2008 Apertura Runners-up

References

External links
 
 Miguel Ángel Hurtado stats at Soccerpunter
 

1985 births
Living people
Sportspeople from Santa Cruz de la Sierra
Association football defenders
Bolivian footballers
Bolivia international footballers
2015 Copa América players
La Paz F.C. players
Club Real Potosí players
Nacional Potosí players
Club Blooming players